Cryptachaea is a genus of spiders in the Theridiidae (tangle web spider) family.

Taxonomy
Many species in this genus used to reside in Achaearanea, which received a major revision in 2008. The genus was originally established as a subgenus of Theridion.

Distribution
This is mostly a New World genus, with many species in South America. One species is cosmopolitan, one species occurs in the whole Palearctic, another only in China. C. veruculata was introduced to Europe from New Zealand.

Name
The genus name is a combination of Achaea, the old name of the genus Achaearanea, and Ancient Greek κρυπτός "hidden". The genus is called Iwama-himegumo zoku in Japanese.

Species

 Cryptachaea acoreensis (Berland, 1932) — Cosmopolitan
 Cryptachaea alacris (Keyserling, 1884) — Colombia, Venezuela
 Cryptachaea altiventer (Keyserling, 1884) — Brazil
 Cryptachaea amazonas Buckup, Marques & Rodrigues, 2012
 Cryptachaea ambera (Levi, 1963) — USA
 Cryptachaea analista (Levi, 1963) — Brazil
 Cryptachaea anastema (Levi, 1963) — Venezuela
 Cryptachaea azteca (Chamberlin & Ivie, 1936) — Mexico
 Cryptachaea banosensis (Levi, 1963) — Ecuador
 Cryptachaea barra (Levi, 1963) — Brazil
 Cryptachaea bellula (Keyserling, 1891) — Brazil
 Cryptachaea blattea (Urquhart, 1886) — cosmopolitan
 Cryptachaea caliensis (Levi, 1963) — Colombia, Ecuador
 Cryptachaea canionis (Chamberlin & Gertsch, 1929) — USA
 Cryptachaea caqueza (Levi, 1963) — Colombia
 Cryptachaea chilensis (Levi, 1963) — Chile
 Cryptachaea chiricahua (Levi, 1955) — USA
 Cryptachaea cinnabarina (Levi, 1963) — Brazil
 Cryptachaea diamantina (Levi, 1963) — Brazil
 Cryptachaea dromedariformis (Roewer, 1942) — Ecuador, Peru
 Cryptachaea eramus (Levi, 1963) — Brazil
 Cryptachaea fresno (Levi, 1955) — USA
 Cryptachaea gigantea (Keyserling, 1884) — Peru
 Cryptachaea gigantipes (Keyserling, 1890) — Australia, New Zealand
 Cryptachaea hirta (Taczanowski, 1873) — Panama to Argentina
 Cryptachaea ingijonathorum Buckup, Marques & Rodrigues, 2012
 Cryptachaea inops (Levi, 1963) — Brazil, Guyana
 Cryptachaea insulsa (Gertsch & Mulaik, 1936) — USA, Mexico
 Cryptachaea isana (Levi, 1963) — Brazil
 Cryptachaea jequirituba (Levi, 1963) — Brazil, Paraguay, Argentina
 Cryptachaea kaspi (Levi, 1963) — Peru
 Cryptachaea koepckei (Levi, 1963) — Peru
 Cryptachaea lota (Levi, 1963) — Chile
 Cryptachaea manzanillo (Levi, 1959) — Mexico
 Cryptachaea maraca (Buckup & Marques, 1991) — Brazil
 Cryptachaea maxima (Keyserling, 1891) — Brazil
 Cryptachaea meraukensis (Chrysanthus, 1963) — New Guinea
 Cryptachaea migrans (Keyserling, 1884) — Venezuela to Peru, Brazil
 Cryptachaea milagro (Levi, 1963) — Ecuador
 Cryptachaea maldonado Buckup, Marques & Rodrigues, 2012
 Cryptachaea nayaritensis (Levi, 1959) — Mexico
 Cryptachaea oblivia (O. P.-Cambridge, 1896) — Costa Rica, Panama
 Cryptachaea orana (Levi, 1963) — Ecuador
 Cryptachaea pallipera (Levi, 1963) — Brazil
 Cryptachaea parana (Levi, 1963) — Paraguay
 Cryptachaea passiva (Keyserling, 1891) — Brazil
 Cryptachaea pilaton (Levi, 1963) — Ecuador
 Cryptachaea pinguis (Keyserling, 1886) — Brazil, Uruguay
 Cryptachaea porteri (Banks, 1896) — USA to Panama, West Indies
 Cryptachaea projectivulva (Yoshida, 2001) — Japan
 Cryptachaea pura (O. P.-Cambridge, 1894) — Mexico
 Cryptachaea pusillana (Roewer, 1942) — French Guiana
 Cryptachaea pydanieli (Buckup & Marques, 1991) — Brazil
 Cryptachaea rafaeli (Buckup & Marques, 1991) — Brazil
 Cryptachaea rapa (Levi, 1963) — Paraguay
 Cryptachaea rioensis (Levi, 1963) — Brazil
 Cryptachaea riparia (Blackwall, 1834) — Palearctic
 Cryptachaea rostra (Zhu & Zhang, 1992) — China
 Cryptachaea rostrata (O. P.-Cambridge, 1896) — Mexico to Venezuela
 Cryptachaea rupicola (Emerton, 1882) — USA, Canada
 Cryptachaea schneirlai (Levi, 1959) — Panama
 Cryptachaea schraderorum (Levi, 1959) — Costa Rica
 Cryptachaea serenoae (Gertsch & Archer, 1942) — USA
 Cryptachaea sicki (Levi, 1963) — Brazil
 Cryptachaea taeniata (Keyserling, 1884) — Guatemala to Peru
 Cryptachaea tovarensis (Levi, 1963) — Venezuela
 Cryptachaea trinidensis (Levi, 1959) — Trinidad, Peru
 Cryptachaea uviana (Levi, 1963) — Peru
 Cryptachaea veruculata (Urquhart, 1886) — Australia, New Zealand, England, Belgium
 Cryptachaea vivida (Keyserling, 1891) — Brazil
 Cryptachaea zonensis (Levi, 1959) — Panama to Peru, Brazil

Notes

References
  (2008): A revision of the genus Achaearanea (Araneae: Theridiidae). Acta Arachnologica 57(1): 37-40. PDF
  (2009): The world spider catalog, version 9.5. American Museum of Natural History.

Theridiidae
Araneomorphae genera
Cosmopolitan spiders